An open formula is a formula that contains at least one free variable.

An open formula does not have a truth value assigned to it, in contrast with a closed formula which constitutes a proposition and thus can have a truth value like true or false. An open formula can be transformed into a closed formula by applying quantifiers or specifying of the domain of discourse of individuals for each free variable denoted x, y, z....or x1, x2, x3.... This transformation is called capture of the free variables to make them bound variables, bound to a domain of individual constants.

For example, when reasoning about natural numbers, the formula "x+2 > y" is open, since it contains the free variables x and y. In contrast, the formula "∃y ∀x: x+2 > y" is closed, and has truth value true.

An example of closed formula with truth value false involves the sequence of Fermat numbers

studied by Fermat in connection to the primality. The attachment of the predicate letter P (is prime) to each number from the Fermat sequence gives a set of false closed formulae when the rank n of the Fermat number is greater than 4. Thus the closed formula ∀n P(Fn) is false.

See also 
 First-order logic
 Higher-order logic
 Quantifier (logic)
 Predicate (mathematical logic)

References 

 
 

Logical expressions